David S. Sigdestad is a Democratic member of the South Dakota House of Representatives, representing the 1st district since 2000.

References

External links
South Dakota Legislature – David Sigdestad official SD House website

Project Vote Smart – Representative David S. Sigdestad (SD) profile
Follow the Money – David Sigdestad
2006 2004 2002 2000 campaign contributions

Democratic Party members of the South Dakota House of Representatives
Living people
1942 births
People from Day County, South Dakota
Northern State University alumni
Farmers from South Dakota